Toddy Time is an Australian television series which aired in Melbourne during 1961, on station GTV-9. The first episode aired 1 May 1961. It was a daytime series made up of various segments, including "camera test", which was a talent segment. The series aired at 11:30AM, and was typically the first show of the day (television in Australia and many other countries was not yet a 24-hour service). It was hosted by Hal Todd.

References

External links
Toddy Time on IMDb

1961 Australian television series debuts
1961 Australian television series endings
Black-and-white Australian television shows
English-language television shows